Owen Trout (born 15 October 1999) is a professional rugby league footballer who plays as a  or  for the Huddersfield Giants in the Betfred Super League.

He has previously played for the Leeds Rhinos in the Super League, and on loan from Leeds at the Dewsbury Rams and Featherstone Rovers in the Betfred Championship.

Background
Owen Trout is a rugby league player, brother of the rugby league footballer; Kyle Trout.

Career
In 2019 he made professional debut on loan at the Dewsbury Rams in the Betfred Championship. Later that year he made his debut for Leeds Rhinos against Workington Town in the Challenge cup. Trout made a move to  Huddersfield in 2020 playing six games.  In 2021 he played 15 games.  On 28 May 2022, Trout played for Huddersfield in their 2022 Challenge Cup Final loss to Wigan.

References

External links
Leeds Rhinos profile
SL profile

1999 births
Living people
Dewsbury Rams players
England Knights national rugby league team players
English rugby league players
Featherstone Rovers players
Huddersfield Giants players
Leeds Rhinos players
Rugby league locks
Rugby league five-eighths
Rugby league props